Supervivientes: Perdidos en el Caribe, After several years on Antena 3, the Spanish version of Survivor returned to Telecinco in 2006. Despite the change in networks, the show's format remained virtually unchanged. For this season thirteen castaways were stranded on an island in Santo Domingo (Dominican Republic). Jesús Vázquez (in studio) and José María Íñigo (from the island) were the hosts for this season. The show began airing on May 2, 2006 and finished on July 11, 2006 after 70 days. A new twist was added to the mechanics of competition: the castaway kicked out of the week received the opportunity to live in solitude on "The Last Beach", unknown to the contestants left in the competition, where they would fight to return to the competition. Ultimately, it was Carmen Russo, who was initially the second contestant to be eliminated from the competition, who won the season over Verónica Romero and Jesús de Manuel.

Finishing order

Nominations table 

: At the launch day the survivors nominated. Carmen, Marlène and Verónica H. were nominated. A one-hour public vote was open and Marlène was eliminated. Marlène decided to not stay in The Last Beach.
: Carmen and Verónica H. survived the first elimination, for this reason they were automatically nominated. Carmen was evicted but she decided to stay in The Last Beach.
: As the winner of the immunity challenge, Verónica R. was given the power to name a second nominee. Esmeralda decided to not stay in The Last Beach.
: As the winner of the immunity challenge, Luna was given the power to name a second nominee. Pepe decided to not stay in The Last Beach.
: As the winner of the immunity challenge, Aída was given the power to name a second nominee. Luna decided to not stay in The Last Beach.
: As the winner of the immunity challenge, Jordi was given the power to name a second nominee. Pipi decided to stay in The Last Beach and the public voted to save between Carmen and Pipi.
: As the winner of the immunity challenge, Jordi was given the power to name a second nominee. Ángel decided to not stay in The Last Beach.
: As the winner of the immunity challenge, Jesús was given the power to name a second nominee. Marta decided to stay in The Last Beach and the public voted to save between Carmen and Marta.
: As the winner of the immunity challenge, Jordi was given the power to name a second nominee. Verónica H. decided to not stay in The Last Beach.
: As the winner of the immunity challenge, Jesús was given the power to name a second nominee. Aída was eliminated and she decided to not stay in The Last Beach.
: After Aída's elimination, Carmen joined to the survivors and a public vote was open to evict one of them.
: At this round the public was voting to choose the winner of this season.

External links
http://www.telecinco.es/supervivientes/

Survivor Spain seasons
2006 Spanish television seasons